Bristlecone Holdings LLC is a Reno, Nevada-based subprime consumer finance business specializing in the leasing of tangible goods, such as pets and wedding dresses.  Bristlecone was founded in 2013. Bristlecone received a seed round of $1.1 million from SenaHill Partners LP in 2014.

Bristlecone filed for Chapter 11 bankruptcy protection on April 18, 2017. On the same day, a competing company sued Bristlecone Holdings for alleged breach of contract, stealing trade secrets and using stolen technology to undercut them during a failed acquisition.

Bristlecone assigns some of its contracts to Monterey Financial.

Bristlecone companies
 I Do Lending (bridal)
 OneRoad Lending (automotive)
 WAGS Lending (purebred pet leasing; also called WAGS Financing)

References

Companies based in Reno, Nevada